Luke Prestridge (born September 17, 1956) is a former punter with a 6-year career in the National Football League. He was selected to the Pro Bowl after the 1982 season as a member of the Denver Broncos. In high school, he was the quarterback and punter for the Sharpstown Apollos in Houston, Texas (class of 1975). 's NFL off-season, Luke Prestridge held at the Broncos franchise records for punts in a game (12; tied with 2 others), and career post-season yards per punt (45.7).

In a 1984 game in Week 8 between the New England Patriots and Miami Dolphins, Prestridge booted an 89-yard punt, which at the time tied an NFL record for longest punt. Through the 2018 NFL season, it remained the fourth longest punt in the NFL Super Bowl era. 

1956 births
Living people
People from Houston
American football punters
Baylor Bears football players
Denver Broncos players
New England Patriots players
American Conference Pro Bowl players